Events in the year 2020 in Malta.

Incumbents
 President: George Vella
 Prime Minister: Joseph Muscat (until 13 January) Robert Abela (from 13 January)

Year

References

 
2020s in Malta
Years of the 21st century in Malta
Malta
Malta